James Couttet (6 July 1921 – 13 November 1997) was a French alpine skier and ski jumper. As an alpine skier he competed at the 1948 and 1952 Olympics and won two medals in 1948: a silver in the slalom and a bronze in the combined event. As a ski jumper he placed 25th in the normal hill at the 1948 Games. Couttet won a full set of medals at the world championships: a gold in 1938 and a silver and bronze in 1950. He retired in 1955 to become a skiing coach and prepare the French alpine skiing team for the 1956 Winter Olympics. He later helped design and build ski lifts. He was married to Lucienne Schmidt-Couttet, a fellow alpine skier who competed at the 1948 Olympics.

References

1921 births
1997 deaths
Sportspeople from Haute-Savoie
French male alpine skiers
French male ski jumpers
Olympic alpine skiers of France
Olympic ski jumpers of France
Alpine skiers at the 1948 Winter Olympics
Alpine skiers at the 1952 Winter Olympics
Olympic silver medalists for France
Olympic medalists in alpine skiing
Medalists at the 1948 Winter Olympics
Olympic bronze medalists for France
Ski jumpers at the 1948 Winter Olympics